The following is a timeline of the history of the municipality of The Hague, Netherlands,

Prior to 19th century

 ca.1230 - Hunting lodge established by Floris IV, Count of Holland.
 ca.1280 - Chapel built in the Binnenhof (approximate date).
 ca.1290 - Completion of the Ridderzaal building in the Binnenhof by Floris V, Count of Holland.
 ca.1380 - Civic Guard of The Hague established, the Saint George Archers Guild.
 1397 - Cloister Church erected.
 15th C. - Sint-Jacobskerk (church) building expanded.
 1446 - Staten-Generaal (parliament) begins meeting in the Binnenhof.
 1456 - Order of the Golden Fleece meets in The Hague for their 9th chapter.
 1467 - Charles the Bold inaugurated in The Hague as Count of Holland.
 1479 - Wolfert VI of Borselen and Reyner of Broeckhuysen conquer and plunder The Hague.
 1489 - Francis of Brederode conquers The Hague and puts it to ransom.
 1494 - Saint Laurence chamber of rhetoric active.
 1516 - Printing press in operation.
 1527 - The Hague becomes "the seat of the supreme court in Holland."
 1528 - Maarten van Rossum, field marshal of Charles, Duke of Guelders, sacks The Hague.
 1565 - Town Hall built.
 1573 - During the Siege of Leiden the Spanish general Francisco de Valdez has his headquarters in The Hague.
 1584 - The Hague becomes "the place of assembly of the States of Holland and of the States-general."
 1595 - Noordeinde Palace purchased. 
 1603 - Treaty of The Hague, between Enno III, Count of East Frisia and the rebellious city of Emden.
 1619 - Execution of statesman Johan van Oldenbarnevelt.
 1644 - Mauritshuis (residence) built.
 1646 - Huis ten Bosch (palace) built.
 1648 - Royal Palace of Amsterdam completed as a City Hall.
 1651 -  held.
 1653 -  (Scheveningen-The Hague) road built.
 1656
 Nieuwe Kerk (church) built.
 Confrerie Pictura (artists' group) formed.
 1658 - Huygens invents the pendulum clock.
 1659 - Concert of The Hague (1659)
 1672 - 20 August: Lynching of Cornelis and Johan de Witt.
 1681 - Boterwaag (weigh house for butter) built.
 1701 - Treaty of The Hague, between England, the Holy Roman Empire, and the United Provinces, creating an alliance against France.
 1708 - Gravenhaagsche Courant newspaper in publication.
 1720 - Treaty of The Hague, ending the War of the Quadruple Alliance.
 1726 -  built.
 1747 - William IV, Prince of Orange moves to The Hague.
 1750 - 's circulating library in business.
 1764 - Lange Voorhout Palace built.
 1772 - Kunstliefde Spaart geen Vlijt literary society formed.
 1774 - Prince William V Gallery established, the first public museum of the Netherlands
 1793 - Diligentia (society) founded.
 1795
 31 January: Declaration of the Rights of Man and of the Citizen, in The Hague, by the revolutionary Patriots, similar to the French declaration of 1789.
 16 May: French-Batavian treaty signed in The Hague.
 1798 - Royal Library of the Netherlands established.

19th century

 1804 - Scheurleer & Zoonen in business.
 1806 - Granted city rights by Louis Bonaparte
 1814 - Staatscourant newspaper begins publication.
 1816 - Royal Cabinet of Rarities founded by King William I of the Netherlands.
 1822 - Mauritshuis re-established.
 1823 - Metal Factory of Enthoven opens.
 1824 -  becomes mayor.
 1838
 Supreme Court of the Netherlands headquartered in The Hague.
 Gymnasium Haganum (school) active.
 1844 -  built on Wagenstraat.
 1852 - Museum Meermanno-Westreenianum established.
 1853 - Martinus Nijhoff Publishers in business.
 1855 - Pander & Son founded, an aircraft and furniture factory.
 1863 -  (zoo) established.
 1866 - Kunstmuseum Den Haag established.
 1870s - Artistic "Hague School" style of painting active.
 1870
 Gouda–Den Haag railway begins operating.
  (train station) opens.
 1872 - Hague Congress of the International Workingmen's Association.
 1881 - 1 August: Panorama Mesdag opens.
 1882 - The Prisongate Museum opens.
 1883 - Rozenburg Earthenware factory established.
 1884 -  established.
 1885
  shopping arcade opens.
  in business.
 1887 - Museum Mesdag opens.
 1890 - Royal (restaurant) in business.
 1893 - Hague Conference on Private International Law
 1898 -  Nationale Tentoonstelling van Vrouwenarbeid 1898
 1899
 International peace conference held in The Hague.
 Permanent Court of Arbitration established.
 1900 - Population: 212,211.

20th century

 1903 -  established.
 1904 
 Residentie Orchestra formed.
 Museum for Education founded, since renamed to Museon.
 1905 - ADO Den Haag football club formed.
 1907
 International peace conference held in The Hague.
 Anglo-Dutch Royal Dutch Shell company and its Bataafse Petroleum Maatschappij headquartered in city.
 1913 - Peace Palace built.
 1914 - Belgian World War I refugees arrive in The Hague. Thousands would follow. 
 1917 
 Hundreds of British soldiers arrive in The Hague, to recover from the stress of their detainment in camps.
 The House of Lords (restaurant) in business.
 1918 - Townley Hall built in The Hague, barracks for 1,200 detained British soldiers and officers. Named after Sir Walter Beaupré Townley, a British diplomat.
 1919 - Population: 359,610.
 1921 - Asta cinema opens.
 1922 
 15 June: Museum Bredius founded.
 22 July: International Permanent Court of Arbitration begins operating from its headquarters in The Hague.
 1923 - The Hague Academy of International Law established.
 1925 - Zuiderpark Stadion (stadium) opens.
 1929 - Netherlands Postal Museum opens, since renamed to COMM
 1935 - Gemeentemuseum Den Haag (museum for modern art) opens.
 1940 - 10 May: Battle for The Hague.
 1945 - 3 March: Bombing of the Bezuidenhout.
 1946 - United Nations International Court of Justice headquartered in The Hague.
 1947 -  established.
 1948 - Congress of Europe in The Hague.
 1950 -  rebuilt.
 1952 - International Institute of Social Studies established.
 1954 -  founded.
 1955 - Mobarak Mosque built.
 1959 - Nederlands Dans Theater founded.
 1966 - July: Death of Hsu Tsu-tsai.
 1969 - World Forum Convention Center opens.
 1971 - International Federation of Library Associations headquartered in city.
 1973 - Den Haag Centraal railway station built.
 1974 - 13 September: 1974 French Embassy attack in The Hague.
 1976 - Eurovision Song Contest 1976 held in The Hague.
 1979 - Assassination of Richard Sykes (British diplomat).
 1980 - Population: 456,886 municipality.
 1981 - Filmhouse The Hague (arthouse) opens.
 1982 - National Library of the Netherlands building opens.
 1983 - 29 October: Demonstration against placement of cruise missiles in Woensdrecht Air Base.
 1984 - Korzo Theater for experimental dance and music founded.
 1985 - Trekvlietbrug (bridge) built.
 1986 - Historical Museum of The Hague opens
 1987
 Koolhaas's deconstructivist-style  built for the Netherlands Dance Theatre troupe.
 The Hague University of Applied Sciences established.
 1991 - International Unrepresented Nations and Peoples Organization headquartered in The Hague.
 1992 - 16 September: Pension de Vogel homeless hostel fire.
 1994 
 Beelden aan Zee (sculpture museum) opens.
 Kinderboekenmuseum founded.
 1995 
 The Hague City Hall new building constructed.
 Yi Jun Peace Museum opens.
 1996 - Wim Deetman becomes mayor.
 1998 
 Europol established in The Hague.
 Calla's restaurant in business.
 1999 -  active.

21st century

 2002 
 Eurojust established in The Hague.
 Regio Randstad regional governance group and Escher Museum established.
 Fotomuseum Den Haag (museum for photography) opened.
 Escher Museum opens.
 2003
 Hoftoren hi-rise built.
 International Criminal Court established in The Hague.
 Population: 463,826.
 2004 - Police raid a safehouse of terrorist organization Hofstad Network.
 2006 - The Hague Jazz fest begins.
 2007
 Regional RandstadRail 3 begins operating.
 Kyocera Stadion (stadium) opens.
 Het Strijkijzer hi-rise built.
 Humanity House opens.
 2008 - Jozias van Aartsen becomes mayor.
 2011
 The Hague Institute for Global Justice established.
 Huygens Institute for the History of the Netherlands established.
 De Kroon hi-rise built.
 2013 - Population: 505,856 municipality.
 2014
 March: International 2014 Nuclear Security Summit held in city.
 Population: 510,909 municipality; 2,261,844 metro region.
 2017 - Pauline Krikke becomes mayor.

Images

See also
 The Hague history
 
 List of mayors of The Hague
 Other names of The Hague e.g. Haag, 'sGravenhage
 
 
 Timelines of other municipalities in the Netherlands: Amsterdam, Breda, Delft, Eindhoven, Groningen, Haarlem, 's-Hertogenbosch, Leiden, Maastricht, Nijmegen, Rotterdam, Utrecht

ReferencesThis article incorporates information from the Dutch Wikipedia.''

Bibliography

Published in the 18th-19th c.in English 
 
 
 
 
 
 in Dutch  1889-

Published in the 20th-21st c.in English 
  (+ 1876 ed.)
 
  (+ 1881 ed.)
 
 
 
 in Dutch'''

External links

 
 Europeana. Items related to The Hague, various dates.
 Digital Public Library of America. Items related to The Hague, various dates

 
Hague
Years in the Netherlands